This is a list of civil parishes in the ceremonial county of Kent, England. There are 326 civil parishes.

Population figures are unavailable for some of the smallest parishes.

The following former districts (or parts of) are unparished: Tunbridge Wells Municipal Borough, Tonbridge Urban District, Margate Municipal Borough, Sittingbourne and Milton Urban District, Queenborough-in-Sheppey, Municipal Borough of Rochester, Municipal Borough of Gillingham, Municipal Borough of Chatham, Maidstone Municipal Borough, Northfleet Urban District, Gravesend Municipal Borough, Dartford Municipal Borough, Canterbury County Borough, Herne Bay Urban District, Whitstable Urban District and Ashford Urban District.

See also
 List of civil parishes in England

References

External links
 Office for National Statistics : Geographical Area Listings

Civil parishes
Kent
 
Civil parishes